Raag Desh is a 2017 Indian historical action drama film directed by Tigmanshu Dhulia and produced by Gurdeep Singh Sappal and Rajya Sabha TV. The film is based on Indian National Army trials, the joint court martial of  Indian National Army officers Colonel Prem Sahgal, Colonel Gurbaksh Singh Dhillon, Major Shah Nawaz Khan on charges of treason against the British Empire during World War 2. The leading roles in Raag Desh have been played by Kunal Kapoor, Amit Sadh, Mohit Marwah and Mrudula Murali. The film was released on July 28, 2017. Rishi Punjabi is the cinematographer of the film.

Premises
A period film based on the historic 1945 Indian National Army Red Fort Trials.

Cast

 Kunal Kapoor as Shah Nawaz Khan
 Amit Sadh as Gurbaksh Singh Dhillon
 Hikaru Ito as Chief General Japanese Army Officer
 Mohit Marwah as Prem Sahgal
 Vijay Varma as Jamal Kidwai
 Keneth Desai as Bhulabhai Desai
 Kenny Basumatary as Netaji Subhas Chandra Bose
 Mrudula Murali as Captain Laxmi Sahgal
 Alexx O'Nell as Colonel P. Walsh
 Zakir Hussain as Lieutenant Nag
 Kanwaljit Singh as Prem's Father
 Rajesh Khera as Jawahar Lal Nehru
 Deepraj Rana as Afzal Khan
 Amrita Rai as Col. Dhillon's Mother
 Kuldip Sareen as Col. Dhillon's Father
 Vishwas Kini as Mohan Singh
 Anil Rastogi as Kailash Nath Katju

Soundtrack

The soundtrack of Raag Desh consists of four songs composed by Rana Mazumder, Ram Singh Thakuri & Siddharth Pandit.

Critical reception

Rohit Vats of Hindustan Times gave the film a rating of 3.5 out of 5, saying that the movie is, "A heavy dose of patriotism that is totally worth your time." Nihit Bhave of The Times of India gave the film a rating of 3 out of 5 and said that, "Had the screenplay been freed of its half-hearted side-tracks, it would have made for great infotainment. The movie is only half of that word now." Kunal Guha of Mumbai Mirror gave the film a rating of 2.5 out of 5 saying that, "Tigmanshu Dhulia's historical drama has a compelling story but is fleshed out half-heartedly". Shubhra Gupta of The Indian Express gave the film a rating of 2 out of 5 and said that, "Raag Desh has lofty ambition, but the stagey treatment lets it down. The war scenes are plentiful but you can't help seeing the clunkiness." Saibal Chatterjee of NDTV gave the film a rating of 3 out of 5 saying that Raag Desh "is a riveting, if not exactly exhilarating, epic tale that presents a prudent blend of war, patriotic fervour, expert legal sleights and good old human drama."

Rohit Bhatnagar of Deccan Chronicle gave the film a rating of 2 out of 5 and said that, "On the whole, Raag Desh is an average film with an untold factual story. The film could have been a much better plus in the era of commercial films, Raag Desh is a niche in its own genre." Kennith Rosario of The Hindu commented on the film that, "It is rather disappointing to see a film that ticks all the right boxes, fall apart because of the lack of a captivating narrative." Nandini Ramnath of Scroll praised the film, saying that, "Despite numerous rousing speeches for freedom, the movie never slides into chest-thumping jingoism, and at 137 minutes, provides an absorbing account of a fascinating and underexplored chapter of the freedom struggle." Sameeksha of News18 gave the film a rating of 2.5 out of 5 and said that, "Tigmanshu Dhulia brings forth a forgotten chapter of 1945 Red Fort trials and makes it into a history class rather than an engaging watch."

References

External links
 

2017 films
2010s Hindi-language films
Films set in Delhi
Films shot in Delhi
Films set in India
Indian historical drama films
Indian biographical drama films
Indian war drama films
Indian films based on actual events
Indian National Army in fiction
Films set in the Indian independence movement
2017 biographical drama films
2010s historical drama films
Films directed by Tigmanshu Dhulia
Indian historical action films
2017 drama films
Films about Subhas Chandra Bose
Indian World War II films